The 2007–08 Luxembourg National Division was the 94th season of top level association football in Luxembourg. The competition ran from August 2007 to 31 May 2008. F91 Dudelange won their fourth consecutive title.

Teams

Format
As in 2006–07, the 2007–08 season involved a round-robin among the fourteen teams.  Thus, each team played 26 games over the course of the calendar.

The bottom two teams were relegated automatically; these teams were CS Pétange and FC Victoria Rosport.  The third-bottom (twelfth-placed) team was required to take part in a play-off with the third-placed team from the Division of Honour for the place in the National Division the following season.  In the event, FC Wiltz 71 finished third-bottom, and lost the play-off to Sporting Steinfort.

European qualification
Luxembourg was assigned one spot in the first qualifying round of the UEFA Champions League, for the league champions, F91 Dudelange.  It has also been assigned two spots in the first qualifying round of the UEFA Cup, for the runners-up, Racing FC Union Luxembourg, and the Luxembourg Cup winners.  If, as happened two seasons previously, the league champions and runners-up had both reach the cup final, the second UEFA Cup spot would have gone to the team placed third in the league.  However, in the event, neither of the top two clubs reached the semi-finals, and the cup-winners spot went to CS Grevenmacher.  Jeunesse Esch have not applied to play in the UEFA Intertoto Cup 2008, so Etzella Ettelbruck have qualified in Jeunesse's place.

Final standings

Results

Relegation play-off

As a result of their victory, Sporting Steinfort were promoted to the National Division for the 2008-09 season, and FC Wiltz 71 relegated to the Division of Honour.

Top goalscorers

References 

Luxembourg National Division seasons
Luxembourg National Division, 2007-08
Luxembourg National Division, 2007-08